Jørgen Bernhoft Lysholm (17 March 1796 - 24 September 1843) was born in Trondheim, Norway. In the 18th century, Jørgen B. Lysholm was the best known name in the liquor business.

Jørgen B. Lysholm and his factory 

As a young man, Jørgen studied in Berlin. Jørgen's father, Nicolay, established a soap factory on Fagerheim in Trondheim, together with his brother. In 1821 the factory was signed over to Jørgen and he made a liquor factory out of it. The factory delivered all kinds of liquor, such as punsj and aquavit. Lysholm was the first to produce Linie Aquavit, which became the company’s most popular brand and best selling product. Today, Linie Aquavit is still represented as in 1842.

After a few years he moved the whole production to Olav Tryggvasons gate 26, also called “Lysholmsgården”.

History of the Lysholmer's 

The Lysholmer’s were wealthy shopkeepers from Flensburg who came to Trondheim in the 16th century.

Jøgen B Lyshom lived only 47 years. He died on the way home from Weisebaden in 1843.

There is an avenue named in honor of him in Trondheim. This avenue passes by the estate of his factory on Lade.

References

1796 births
1843 deaths
Norwegian businesspeople
People from Trondheim